Lisa Maria Herzog (born December 17, 1983 in Nuremberg) is a German philosopher and social scientist who works at the intersection of political philosophy and economic thought. On October 1, 2019, she began a professorship in philosophy at the Center for Philosophy, Politics and Economics at the University of Groningen in the Netherlands.

Works
 Inventing the Market. Smith, Hegel, and Political Theory. Oxford University Press, Oxford 2013, ISBN 0-19-967417-5.
 Hegel’s Thought in Europe: Currents, Crosscurrents, Countercurrents. Palgrave Macmillan, Houndsmill/Basingstoke 2013, ISBN 1-137-30921-0.
 Markets. In: Stanford Encyclopedia of Philosophy. 2013.
 Intersubjektive Sanktionen als normative Gründe. In: Eva Buddeberg & Achim Vesper (Hrsg.): Moral und Sanktion. Eine Kontroverse über die Autorität moralischer Normen. Campus-Verlag, Frankfurt/New York 2013, ISBN 978-3-593-39597-5.
 Freiheit gehört nicht nur den Reichen. Plädoyer für einen zeitgemäßen Liberalismus. Beck, München 2014, ISBN 978-3-406-65933-1; BpB, Bonn 2014, ISBN 978-3-8389-0442-9.
 with Axel Honneth Der Wert des Marktes. Ein ökonomisch-philosophischer Diskurs vom 18. Jahrhundert bis zur Gegenwart. Suhrkamp, Frankfurt 2014, ISBN 978-3-518-29665-3.
 Reclaiming the System. Moral Responsibility, Divided Labour, and the Role of Organizations in Society. Oxford University Press, Oxford 2018, ISBN 978-0-198-83040-5.

References 

Living people
1983 births

21st-century  German economists
21st-century  German  philosophers
People from Nuremberg
German women philosophers